Pa Tang (also Romanized as Pā Tang) is a village in Gazik Rural District, Gazik District, Darmian County, South Khorasan Province, Iran. At the 2006 census, its population was 150, in 45 families.

References 

Populated places in Darmian County